KATQ may refer to:

 KATQ (AM), a radio station (1070 AM) licensed to Plentywood, Montana, United States
 KATQ-FM, a radio station (100.1 FM) licensed to Plentywood, Montana, United States